Pelletan Point is a long, narrow point projecting into the head of Flandres Bay 3 miles south of Briand Fjord, on the west coast of Graham Land. Charted by the French Antarctic Expedition (1903–1905) under Charcot, who applied the name "Baie Pelletan" to the indentations north and south of the point here described. In 1960 the United Kingdom Antarctic Place-Names Committee (UK-APC) transferred the name Pelletan to the point; the two indentations do not together form an identifiable feature and they can be easily described by reference to this point. Charles-Camille Pelletan (1846–1915) was a French politician and Minister of the Navy, 1902–1905.

Headlands of Graham Land
Danco Coast